Manoel Carlos de Lima Filho or simply Neco (born 8 January 1964) is a retired Brazilian footballer who played as a winger and a manager.

He played for Sport Recife in the '80s as one of the heroes of the red-black Pernambuco in winning the Union Cup 1987. After this he was a manager.

He commanded the Salgueiro, in the years 2008 and 2009. He was still in Ypiranga and Petrolina, returning as coach of Willow  in 2013. Neco took over after the fall of Marcelo Martelotte due to poor results in Serie B.

Honors

Player
 1987 – Campeonato Brasileiro (Sport Recife)
 1988 – Campeonato Pernambucano (Sport Recife)
 1991 – Campeonato Pernambucano (Sport Recife)
 1992 – Campeonato Pernambucano (Sport Recife)

References 

 

1964 births
Living people
Brazilian footballers
Brazilian football managers
Campeonato Brasileiro Série A players
Campeonato Brasileiro Série B players
Campeonato Brasileiro Série A managers
Campeonato Brasileiro Série B managers
Sport Club do Recife players
Sport Club do Recife managers
Salgueiro Atlético Clube managers
Association football wingers